Kelleigh Greenberg-Jephcott is an American author. Swan Song, her first novel, was longlisted for the Women's Prize for Fiction 2019, won the McKitterick Prize, won The Sunday Times paperbacks of the year 2019 and was shortlisted for the Goldsboro Books Glass Bell Award.

Early life and education 
Kelleigh Greenberg-Jephcott was born and raised in Houston, Texas, and later lived in Los Angeles and London. She holds a Bachelor of Fine Arts Drama (Directing) from Carnegie Mellon University and studied screenwriting at the University of Southern California.  She obtained her M.A. through the UEA Creative Writing Course and later won the Bridport Arts Centre Prize Peggy Chapman-Andrews Award.

Personal life 
Kelleigh Greenberg-Jephcott is married to the RADA-trained English actor and writer Dominic Jephcott.

References

Living people
American women novelists
University of Southern California alumni
Carnegie Mellon University alumni
Alumni of the University of East Anglia
Year of birth missing (living people)